The 36.9 ultimatum refers to the 1997 ultimatum by then-Prime Minister of Norway, Thorbjørn Jagland, that his government would resign if the Norwegian Labour Party gained less than 36.9% of the votes (the percentage gained by the Labour Party in 1993 under Gro Harlem Brundtland) in the parliamentary election, no matter what the parliamentary situation would be.

As the Labour Party gained only 35%, Jagland's government resigned, even though his party won the election in the sense that it remained the biggest party and could have continued in government. Jagland's 36.9 ultimatum was subject to much public ridicule in 1997 and subsequent years, as well as strong criticism within his own party. When the Labour Party formed a government again in 2000, Jens Stoltenberg became Prime Minister with Jagland as Foreign Minister;  Jens Stoltenberg also succeeded Jagland as leader of the Labour Party in 2002.

References

Political history of Norway
Ultimata
1997 in Norway
1997 in politics
Labour Party (Norway)